Timotej Múdry (born 4 April 2000) is a Slovak professional footballer who plays for ViOn Zlaté Moravce of the Fortuna Liga, on loan from Ružomberok, as a midfielder.

Club career

1. FC Tatran Prešov
Múdry made his Fortuna Liga debut for Tatran Prešov against Zemplín Michalovce on 3 November 2017, replacing Roland Černák, who had provided for the winning goal earlier, in the 85th minute.

References

External links
 Futbal SFZ profile
 Futbalnet profile
 
 

2000 births
Living people
People from Spišská Nová Ves District
Sportspeople from the Košice Region
Slovak footballers
Slovakia under-21 international footballers
Association football midfielders
1. FC Tatran Prešov players
MFK Ružomberok players
FC ViOn Zlaté Moravce players
3. Liga (Slovakia) players
2. Liga (Slovakia) players
Slovak Super Liga players